Mejstřík (feminine Mejstříková) is a Czech surname. Notable people with the surname include:

 Karl Mejstrik, Austrian pair skater
 Martin Mejstřík (born 1962), Czech politician and human rights activist
 Zdeněk Mejstřík, Czech rower

Czech-language surnames